Myelobia nigristigmellus is a moth in the family Crambidae. It is found in Brazil (Parana).

References

Chiloini